Kristin Glosimot Kjelsberg (born 7 November 1959) is a Norwegian handball player. She played 112 matches and scored 371 goals for the Norwegian national team between 1978 and 1983. She represented the club Bækkelagets SK in 1984, when Bækkelaget became Norwegian champions, and Glosimot was top scorer in Eliteserien this year. She participated at the 1982 World Women's Handball Championship, where the Norwegian team placed seventh.

References

External links

1959 births
Living people
Norwegian female handball players
20th-century Norwegian women